Endiandra discolor is an Australian tree, growing from near Gosford, New South Wales (33° S) to Tully, Queensland (17° S) in the tropics. Common names include rose walnut and domatia tree.

Endiandra discolor is a buttressed rainforest tree. The habitat is tropical, warm temperate or subtropical rainforest, particularly on the poorer volcanic soil types, and alluvial soil near streams.

Description 
Endiandra discolor is a medium to large size tree, occasionally reaching 40 metres in height and 90 cm in trunk diameter. The base of the tree is significantly buttressed, up to 2 metres high on larger trees.

The bark is brown or brownish grey, smooth on younger trees. The bark of older trees is rougher, with small depressions in the bark which are sometimes inhabited by insects. New branchlets covered with soft downy hairs.

Leaves 

The leaves are alternate, not toothed. 6 to 10 cm long, 2 to 5 cm wide. Blunt or bluntly pointed at the end of the leaf. Ovate to ovate elliptic in shape. Leaf stem 5 to 10 mm long. Leaves glossy on the top surface, greyish or paler underneath. The specific name discolor refers to the difference in colour of the top and bottom leaf surfaces.

Leaves veiny. The midrib, lateral veins and net veins visible on both surfaces, raised and more evident under the leaf. Midrib and lateral veins a pale green colour. The alternative common name domatia tree refers to the prominent raised, kidney shaped glands on the underside of the leaf. They occur at the meeting of the mid-rib and some of the lateral veins.

Flowers and fruit 

Creamy green flowers occur on panicles in the months of October and November. Flowers are tiny, 2 mm long and sweetly scented. The panicles are shorter than the leaves.

The fruit matures from March to April, being a shiny black drupe, 20 to 25 mm long. The flesh is green, surrounding an oval shaped seed, 15 to 20 mm long. Like many Australian laurels, the seed is slightly ribbed. The flesh should be removed from the fruit before sowing the seeds.

Ecology 

Fruit are eaten by many rainforest birds, including the wompoo fruit dove, catbird, rose crowned fruit dove, superb fruit-dove and topknot pigeon. The leaves of Endiandra discolor provide food for the larvae of the Macleay's swallowtail butterfly. Endiandra discolor is a larval host for the fruit fly, Bactrocera endiandrae.

References

  (other publication details, included in citation)
 PlantNET - The Plant Information Network System of Botanic Gardens Trust, Sydney, Australia - retrieved 23 August 2009. http://plantnet.rbgsyd.nsw.gov.au/cgi-bin/NSWfl.pl?page=nswfl&lvl=sp&name=Endiandra~discolor

discolor
Laurales of Australia
Trees of Australia
Flora of New South Wales
Flora of Queensland